Anatoliy Volodimirovich Budyak (born 29 September 1995) is a Ukrainian cyclist, who currently rides for UCI Continental team .

At the 2015 Tour de l'Avenir, after finishing 14th overall, he tested positive for mesocarb, and was suspended by the UCI until 27 February 2017.

Major results

2015
 2nd Overall Volta a Portugal do Futuro
1st Mountains classification
1st Young rider classification
 5th Overall Bałtyk–Karkonosze Tour
 10th Grand Prix of Sochi Mayor
2017
 2nd Road race, National Under-23 Road Championships
 4th Overall Tour of Mersin
 5th Road race, National Road Championships
 8th Overall Tour of Fuzhou
 8th Overall Grand Prix Priessnitz spa
2018
 3rd Overall Tour of Małopolska
 7th Horizon Park Race for Peace
2019
 2nd Overall Tour of Małopolska
1st Mountains classification
1st Stage 1
 2nd Horizon Park Race for Peace
 5th Chabany Race
 7th Horizon Park Race Maidan
 8th Tour de Ribas
 9th Overall Tour of Bihor
2020
 1st Grand Prix World's Best High Altitude
 1st Grand Prix Develi
 2nd Road race, National Road Championships
 2nd GP Manavgat
 3rd Grand Prix Velo Alanya
 4th Overall Tour of Małopolska
 8th Grand Prix Cappadocia
 8th Grand Prix Mount Erciyes
2021
 1st  Overall Tour of Mevlana
1st Stage 3
 1st Grand Prix Kayseri
 2nd Road race, National Road Championships
 3rd Overall Tour of Małopolska 
1st Prologue & Stage 3
 4th Grand Prix Velo Alanya
 4th Grand Prix Gündoğmuş
2022
 1st Grand Prix Mediterranean
 1st Grand Prix Gündoğmuş
 1st Grand Prix Kayseri
 2nd Overall Tour du Rwanda
1st Stage 6 
 3rd Grand Prix Alanya
 3rd Grand Prix Cappadocia
 3rd Grand Prix Kapuzbaşı
 4th Overall Tour of Sharjah
 4th Grand Prix Erciyes
 5th Overall Tour of Azerbaijan (Iran)
 5th Overall Tour of Sakarya
 9th Overall Tour of Antalya
 10th Overall International Tour of Hellas
2023
 9th Overall Tour of Sharjah

References

External links

1995 births
Living people
Ukrainian male cyclists
Sportspeople from Vinnytsia
Olympic cyclists of Ukraine
Cyclists at the 2020 Summer Olympics